is a railway station on the Toei Mita Line in Itabashi, Tokyo, Japan, operated by the Tokyo subway operator Tokyo Metropolitan Bureau of Transportation (Toei).

Lines
Takashimadaira Station is served by the Toei Mita Line, and is numbered "I-25".

Station layout
The Mita line sidings are next to the station.

Platforms

History
It was renamed on 1 August 1969.

See also
 List of railway stations in Japan

External links

 Toei station information 

Railway stations in Tokyo
Railway stations in Japan opened in 1968
Toei Mita Line